Morgan Hill State Forest is a state forest in Onondaga County and Cortland County, New York, United States. 

The hiking trails are part of the main North Country Trail and Onondaga Branch of the Finger Lakes Trail. 

It includes much or all of the Morgan Hill mountain.

References

External links
  Map and photographs of the state forest's trail system.

New York (state) state forests
Protected areas of Onondaga County, New York
Protected areas of Cortland County, New York